Tonus is the Latin equivalent of the English word tone. It is especially used to refer to:

 Muscle tone, the continuous and passive partial contraction of the muscles
 Arterial tone, the continuous and passive partial contraction of the arterioles
 Tonicity, the ability of a solution to cause water movement
 The Pythagorean interval of 9/8
 A brand of fruit juice produced by the Lebedyansky division of PepsiCo in Russia